Jiří Šimánek (born 11 October 1995) is a Czech rower. He competed in the 2020 Summer Olympics, held July–August 2021 in Tokyo.

References

1995 births
Living people
Czech male rowers
Olympic rowers of the Czech Republic
Rowers at the 2020 Summer Olympics